Danko Mandić (born 16 July 1957) is a Croatian sailor. He competed in the Flying Dutchman event at the 1980 Summer Olympics.

References

External links
 

1957 births
Living people
Croatian male sailors (sport)
Olympic sailors of Yugoslavia
Sailors at the 1980 Summer Olympics – Flying Dutchman
Sportspeople from Rijeka